Cornelia Kelleher Harrington (born June 7, 1943) is a retired American speed skater. She competed in the 3000 m event at the 1960 Winter Olympics and placed 18th.

References

External links 
 

1943 births
Living people
Olympic speed skaters of the United States
Speed skaters at the 1960 Winter Olympics